Bak Don-ji was a Korean scholar-bureaucrat, diplomat and ambassador, representing Joseon interests in the  tongsinsa (diplomatic mission) to the Ashikaga shogunate (Muromachi bafuku) in Japan.

1398 mission to Japan
King Taejo dispatched a diplomatic mission to Japan in 1398–1399.  This embassy to shogunal court of Ashikaga Yoshimochi was led by Pak.  In part, the envoy was charged with conveying a response to a message sent to the Joseon court by the Japanese shōgun.  In part, the Joseon ambassador sought Ashikaga involvement in suppressing pirate raiders which were believed to come from Japan.  These pirates were variously known as wokou (Chinese character: 倭寇; Chinese pronunciation: wōkòu; Japanese pronunciation: wakō; Korean pronunciation: 왜구 waegu). 
 
Pak and his retinue arrived in Kyoto in the early autumn of 1398 (Ōei 5, 8th month).  Shōgun Ashikaga Yoshimochi presented the envoy with a formal diplomatic letter; and presents were given for the envoy to convey to the Joseon court.  When Pak returned from Japan in 1399, he brought with him more than 100 wakō captives, an explicit earnest of good fatih.

Pak also bore letters from the Ashikaga shōgun requesting original texts of Buddhist scriptures and Buddhist altar fittings.

Pak conveyed the following letter from Shōgun Yoshimitsu to the governor of Kyushu:

"This instruction is hereby given to you, Ōuchi Sakyo-no-Tayu (Ōuchi Yoshihiro). The Korean envoy, in compliance with the command of his government, came to our country, crossing waters of vast expanse.  He brought us a gift of great value from his nation, thus showing us great courtesy. We have highly appreciated this. Now that this envoy is returning to his country, we should send products of our land in recognition of this gift and as a token of our good will.

"You are also instructed to inform the Korean envoy that all the pirates and persons of the unruly class in Kyushu have been arrested and punished in accordance with the provisions of our laws, and that we are sending troops under the convoy of our fleet to various far-off islands with the purpose of annihilating all the remaining pirate bands. Therefore, from this time on, all ships coming from and returning to Korea will be safeguarded. Thus will the friendship of the two nations be maintained.

"For several years past, we have made many earnest attempts to publish the Daizōkyō, a standard Buddhistic sutra, but have not yet succeeded. According to our understanding, Korea has an excellent edition of this sutra. We would therefore ask that Korea meet our long-felt need by sending us a complete set of this edition. If Korea should grant this request, the propagation of Buddhism toward the East would be materially advanced. We also desire to have a large Buddhistic church bell made of copper, and we also wish to secure good medicinal herbs from Korea. The Buddhistic sutras and accessories are needed in our country in order to save our people from suffering in a future existence. The medicinal herbs will enable our people to enjoy health and longevity in this present world. Korea possesses them in great abundance.

"You are imperatively instructed to convey these desires to the Korean envoy and to impress him with our great need of and desire for them, in order that we may not fail to obtain them."

The Japanese hosts may have construed this mission as tending to confirm a Japan-centric world order.  Pak's words and actions were more narrowly focused in negotiating protocols for Joseon–Japan diplomatic relations.

Recognition in the West
Pak's historical significance was confirmed when his mission was specifically mentioned in a widely distributed history published by the Oriental Translation Fund in 1834.

In the West, early published accounts of the Joseon kingdom are not extensive, but they are found in Sangoku Tsūran Zusetsu (published in Paris in 1832), and in Nihon ōdai ichiran (published in Paris in 1834).  Joseon foreign relations and diplomacy are explicitly referenced in the 1834 work.

See also
 Joseon diplomacy
 Joseon missions to Japan
 Joseon tongsinsa

Notes

References

 Daehwan, Noh. "The Eclectic Development of Neo-Confucianism and Statecraft from the 18th to the 19th Century," Korea Journal (Winter 2003).
 Kang, Etsuko Hae-jin . (1997). Diplomacy and Ideology in Japanese-Korean Relations: from the Fifteenth to the Eighteenth Century. 	Basingstoke, Hampshire; Macmillan. ; 
 Kuno, Yoshi S. (1940). Japanese Expansion on the Asiatic Continent: a Study in the History of Japan with Special Reference to her International Relations with China, Korea, and Russia. Berkeley: University of California Press. 
 Titsingh, Isaac, ed. (1834). [Siyun-sai Rin-siyo/Hayashi Gahō, 1652], Nipon o daï itsi ran; ou, Annales des empereurs du Japon. Paris: Oriental Translation Fund of Great Britain and Ireland. OCLC 84067437

External links
 Joseon Tongsinsa Cultural Exchange Association ; 

Year of birth unknown
Year of death unknown
14th-century Korean people
Korean diplomats
1390s in Japan
1398 in Asia